Mount Isto is the highest peak in the Brooks Range, Alaska, USA. Mount Isto is within the Arctic National Wildlife Refuge and was named in 1966 for Reynold E. (Pete) Isto, a civil engineer for the U.S. Geological Survey. In 2014, new measurement technology established that Mount Isto is the highest peak in the Brooks Range. Previously, Mount Chamberlin was believed to be the tallest, but it is now ranked third.



See also

List of mountain peaks of North America
List of mountain peaks of the United States
List of mountain peaks of Alaska
List of Ultras of the United States

References

External links

Mountains of Alaska
Mountains of North Slope Borough, Alaska
Brooks Range